Jean François Renaudin (13 July 1750 – 29 April 1809) was a French Navy officer and Rear-Admiral. He is mostly known for captaining the Vengeur du Peuple at the Fourth Battle of Ushant.

Career

Early life 
Renaudin was born to a modest family of Saint-Martin du Gua, and joined the merchant navy before enlisting in the French Royal Navy as a suppleant frigate lieutenant in 1779. He served on the fluyt Dorade, on which he took part in four battles. He was promoted to Sous Lieutenant de Vaisseau on 1 May 1786.

At the French Revolution, Renaudin was promoted to Lieutenant de Vaisseau on 1 January 1792, and to Captain on 1 January 1793; he was appointed to command the 20-gun corvette Perdrix, cruising off Belle-Ile and Rochefort. He later transferred to the frigate Andromaque, on which sustained a fight against a ship of the line and four Spanish frigates.

The Vengeur du Peuple at the Glorious First of June 

Renaudin commanded the Vengeur du Peuple in the fleet of Admiral Villaret-Joyeuse. Exiting Brest, Vengeur was separated from her fleet, which prevented her from taking part in the action of 29 May 1794; on the next day, however, she sustained fire from ten British ships while preventing them from cutting the French line of battle.

On the next day, at the Glorious First of June, Renaudin led a fierce battle against HMS Brunswick, in which Brunswick and Vengeur disabled each other. As Vengeur could not be rescued by French frigates, Renaudin asked for help from the British.

Renaudin was rescued by HMS Culloden and abandoned his ship with the first British boat, leaving his men behind in disregard for military customs and the 1765 standing order that Captains had to be last to abandon ship,. Though his account of the event insinuated that he was on a boat close to Vengeur when she foundered, he was in fact dining in the mess of Culloden at the moment of the sinking. Taken in captivity in Tavistock, he wrote an account of the fight of Vengeur on 1 Messidor an II (19 June 1794), signed and had it co-signed by his staff, comprising, Jean Hugine, Louis Rousseau, Pelet, Trouvée, Lussot and others.

In France, Renaudin was assumed to be dead, and posthumously promoted to contre-amiral on 29 August 1794. His return astonished the convention on 10 September 1794, when Jean-Jacques Bréard stated:

Nevertheless, in 1847, Lamartine wrote a description where Renaudin was killed, cut in half by a cannon shot like Dupetit-Thouars, and Thiers later wrote an account repeating Barère's version, where Vengeur refused to surrender.

Remarkably, neither the national Archives, nor the archives of the Navy, nor the archives of the War Council nor Renaudin's personal file mention any court-martial that should have been held automatically for the loss of the ship, in accordance with French law.

Later life 
Renaudin was promoted to rear admiral on 29 August 1794, purportedly a posthumous honour, before being exchanged. He was put in command of Jemmapes before obtaining command of the 3rd Squadron of the naval army of the Ocean (the Brest fleet under Admiral Martin), a 6-ship division, on 29 October 1794, with his flag on Jemmapes. In late February 1795, Renaudin's division left Brest to reinforce the naval forces of Toulon, where it arrived on 3 April 1795.

On 24 March 1798, Renaudin was appointed to the 2nd squadron of the Brest fleet, succeeding Admiral Lelarge. From 21 March 1799, he commanded the naval forces of Napoli, before moving to Toulon to become the senior officer of the garrison on 25 May 1799, replacing Jean Gaspard Vence who had fallen in disfavour after an altercation with Bruix.

On 23 September 1799, Renaudin became general inspector of oceanic harbours from Cherbourg to Bayonne,. He retired on 4 April 1801, and died in Le Gua.

Honours 

 Renaudin's name is engraved on the Arc de Triomphe (40th column).
 Three ships of the French navy named Renaudin in his honour.

Notes and references

Notes

References

Bibliography 
 
 
 
 

 Fonds Marine. Campagnes (opérations ; divisions et stations navales ; missions diverses). Inventaire de la sous-série Marine BB4. Tome premier : BB4 1 à 482 (1790-1826)

External links 
  RENAUDIN Jean-François.Contre-Amiral, Les Amis du Patrimois napoléonien

French Navy admirals
1750 births
1809 deaths
French naval commanders of the Napoleonic Wars
People from Charente-Maritime
Names inscribed under the Arc de Triomphe